Marjorie Joy "Marjie" Millar (August 10, 1931 – April 16, 1966) was an American television and film actress. She was born Marjorie Joy Miller to George W. and Eunice Miller in Tacoma, Washington. Millar's father had changed his surname to "Miller", but she later returned to the original spelling.

Early career and education
During World War II, she was named "Sweetheart of the 41st Division", having performed more than 7,000 hours singing for soldiers at nearby Ft. Lewis.

In 1946, she hosted a variety show for patients at Madigan Army Hospital at Ft. Lewis on the unique radio station for the hospital known as "Voice of Madigan". She attended Ann Wright Seminary, Washington Grammar School, and Mason Junior High School, and graduated in 1950 from Stadium High School in Tacoma. In 1949, she enrolled at Stephens College, an all-women's school in Columbia, Missouri, where she was a double major in radio/drama and psychology, graduating in 1951.

Marriages
Millar was married to University of Missouri college student James Sidney Rollins Jr. (1950–?); photographer and television director John Florea (1954–1957); author and sportswriter John McCallum (1961–64), whom she met when he was writing her biography, and United States Navy and former classmate Lt. Commander Charles Candoo.

Career
She appeared in the television series Dragnet (in 1956) and The Millionaire.

In 1954–1955, Millar co-starred as Susan, an aspiring writer and the love interest of the Ray Bolger character "Raymond Wallace" in the ABC sitcom with a variety show theme, The Ray Bolger Show, previously known as Where's Raymond?.

While working in Los Angeles, she reunited and lived with her roommate from Stephens College, Boni Ann Buehler. Millar later assisted Buehler during her recovery after two limbs were amputated by a boat propeller (Beuhler was represented by Melvin Belli in the famous civil suit against Conrad Hilton).

Millar's biggest film role was playing Dean Martin's love interest in the 1953 Martin and Lewis film Money from Home. She also had a major role in About Mrs. Leslie, a drama starring Shirley Booth and Robert Ryan as the romantic leads. It was not a success at the box office despite its prominent cast.

In the early 1960s, for a short time she was choreographer for the Tacoma instrumental rock group The Ventures.

Injury and later life
Injuries sustained in a 1957 auto accident on Sunset Boulevard, Los Angeles, resulted in infection and gangrene of her left leg. After reporting to work on Dragnet she went back to her apartment and after became too weak to lift the phone, was found by a neighbor who noticed several days' accumulation of milk bottles and newspapers. She was taken to a hospital and saved by massive blood transfusions after an appeal to the public for blood. Her leg was not amputated, but she was forced to end her acting career. She divorced husband John Florea, and moved back to Tacoma, Washington, where she operated a dance school and later started a Puget Sound-area-produced television program with her third husband, author John McCallum. After marrying her fourth husband, she followed him to his duty station in Southern California.

Death
She died at Coronado Hospital in San Diego, California, in 1966 as a result of cirrhosis of the liver and chronic pancreatitis after enduring at least 14 surgeries on her injured leg.

Filmography

References

External links
 
 Marjie Millar

20th-century American actresses
1966 deaths
1931 births
Actresses from San Diego
American film actresses
Actresses from Tacoma, Washington
Deaths from pancreatitis
Deaths from cirrhosis
Stephens College alumni
Alcohol-related deaths in California